Viettessa margaritalis is a moth in the family Crambidae. It was described by George Hampson in 1899. It is found in the Democratic Republic of the Congo (Kasai-Occidental, Katanga), Mozambique, Sierra Leone and Tanzania.

References

Moths described in 1899
Eurrhypini